Nyandeni may refer to
Mpumi Nyandeni (born 1989), South African football midfielder 
Nompumelelo Nyandeni (born 1987), South African football forward
Nyandeni Local Municipality in the Eastern Cape of South Africa